Nicomedes Guzmán (June 25, 1914 in Santiago, Chile – June 26, 1964, also in Santiago), was a Chilean writer, editor, poet, and novelist.

Biography 
The second of twelve children born to Nicomedes Vásquez Arzola and Rosa Guzmán Acevedo, his full legal name was Óscar Nicomedes Vásquez Guzmán. He decided to adopt the penname of Nicomedes, because there was already a famous writer named Óscar in his group, which was the Chilean "Generation of 1938", Óscar Castro Zúñiga (1910–1947).

Guzmán's father worked in several jobs, among which were—as Guzmán often pointed out—a streetcar motorman, a doorman, and occasionally as an ice cream peddler. Guzmán's mother was a housewife and augmented their meagre family income by caring for upper-class homes on occasion (Pearson 1976: 4-5). The author as a "proletarian novelist," wanted to emphasize the humble origin of his family, and did so especially in the dedication of his first novel, Los hombres oscuros, to his parents: "TO MY FATHER, ice cream peddler [heladero ambulante]; TO MY MOTHER, domestic employee [obrera doméstica]"

His formal education was often interrupted by his having to work —as a precocious laborer- to help the large family. Thus his scholarly development was largely autodictic. At age eleven he was a typesetter and bookbinder's assistant; later he was a truck-driver's helper and an errand boy. He carried boxes in a factory and, at age sixteen, obtained a job in a real-estate brokerage. He studied in evening classes in the Federico Hanssen Night School (Pearson 5). Later because of his success in publishing, the government gave him a position in the Department of Culture in the Homeland Ministry, where he worked together with another famous Chilean, the newspaper writer of Las Ultimas Noticias, Luis Sánchez Latorre, known widely as "Filebo."

He married at a young age Lucia Del Cármen Salazar Vidal, and they had five children. He had a further two children from a later marriage with the psychologist and social worker, Esther Josefina Panay Pérez.

After an early writing experience as a poet, Guzmán was very successful with his experiment in writing a proletarian novel in the first-person singular and using the present tense. Los hombres oscuros/obscuros had great success in Chile, and led Guzmán to write a second novel based on children growing up in the slums of Santiago, Chile. This book, La sangre y la esperanza (Blood and Hope) became one of the most important novels of the time in Chile. And for many years was required reading in secondary schools in Chile.

Guzmán continued writing when he had the opportunity. He edited many books, published ímportant anthologies, and helped a number of less-fortunate writers.

Guzmán died the day after his fiftieth birthday.

In honor of Guzmán's birthday (June 25, 1914), during much of the week of June 18 through June 25, 2014 and even later, in numerous universities and communities in all of Chile, events were carried out honoring Guzmán. Both chambers of the Congress of Chile also honored the writer on July 1, 2014.

Works 
Novels and Short Story collections

 Los Hombres Oscuros (often spelled obscuros) (1939)
 La Sangre y la Esperanza (1943)
 Donde Nace el Alba (1944)
 La Carne Iluminada (1945)
 La Luz Viene del Mar (1951) 
 Una Moneda al Río y Otros Cuentos (1954)
 El Pan Bajo la Bota (1960)

Poetry
 La Ceniza y el Sueño (1938)

Anthologies
 Nuevos Cuentistas Chilenos (1941)
 Antología de Baldomero Lillo (1955)
 Antología de Carlos Pezoa Véliz (1957)
 Autorretrato de Chile (1957)
 Antología de Cuentos [de] Marta Brunet (1962)
 Antología de Cuentos Chileno (póstuma, 1969)

References

Sources
 Ferrero, Mario (1982). Nicomedes Guzmán y la Generación del 38. Santiago de Chile: Ediciones Mar Afuera.
 Guzmán, Nicomedes (2007). Estampas populares de Chile: Crónicas. Santiago de Chile: RIL Editores. .
 Pearson, Lon (1976). Nicomedes Guzmán. Proletarian author in Chile's literary generation of 1938. Columbia: University of Missouri Press. .
 Promis [Ojeda], José (1993). La novela chilena del último siglo. Santiago: La Noria.

External links 
 http://nicomedesguzman.cl
 Biografía, fotos, narrativa y obras del Escritor Chileno desarrolladas profundamente en Memoria Chilena
 Generación literaria chilena denominada Generación del 38
 Cronología de Nicomedes Guzmán en memoria chilena 
 Los hombres oscuros en memoria chilena
 La Sangre y La Experanza en memoria chilena
 Una Moneda al Rio y Otros cuentos en memoria chilena
 La Ceniza y el Sueño en memoria chilena
 PDF images in: 

1914 births
1964 deaths
People from Santiago Province, Chile
Chilean editors
Chilean male poets
20th-century Chilean poets
20th-century Chilean male writers
Proletarian literature